Henry Osinde (born 17 October 1978) is a Canadian cricket coach and former player. He immigrated to Canada from Uganda as a young man and represented the Canada national cricket team from 2005 to 2013 as a fast-medium bowler. He played at the 2007 and 2011 Cricket World Cups. He was later interim head coach of Canada in 2017.

Personal life
Osinde was born on 17 October 1978 in Kampala, Uganda. He attended Busoga College Mwiri where he was introduced to cricket at the age of 15. He later attended Makerere University, before immigrating to Canada in 2001. Outside of cricket he worked as an accountant.

Playing career
After moving to Canada, Osinde began playing in the Toronto & District Cricket Association. He was selected in Canada's squad for the 2005 ICC Trophy in Ireland, ironically making his international debut in a warm-up game against Uganda.

Osinde made his first-class debut for Canada against Bermuda in the 2005 Intercontinental Cup. In his second match he recorded 7/53 against Cayman Islands. Later in the year he was one of four Canadians selected to attend the ICC Winter Training Camp (WTC) in South Africa along with players from other associate countries. He was assessed by WTC head coach Andy Moles as "along with Ireland's Eoin Morgan [...] the player with perhaps most potential among those here at the WTC".

At the 2007 Cricket World Cup in the West Indies, Osinde played three games but failed to take a wicket. He returned for the 2011 Cricket World Cup where he took career-best ODI figures of 4/26 against Kenya and was named man of the match. He played his final matches for Canada in 2013.

Coaching career
In 2017, Osinde was appointed as interim head coach of Canada in place of Davy Jacobs. He coached the team at 2017 ICC World Cricket League Division Three in Uganda. He was also an assistant coach of ICC Americas at the 2016–17 Regional Super50.

References

External links 

1978 births
Living people
Canada One Day International cricketers
Canada Twenty20 International cricketers
Canadian cricketers
Canadian people of Ugandan descent
Cricketers at the 2007 Cricket World Cup
Cricketers at the 2011 Cricket World Cup
Makerere University alumni
Tamil Union Cricket and Athletic Club cricketers
Ugandan emigrants to Canada
People educated at Busoga College
Coaches of the Canada national cricket team
People from Kampala